Lepidogyne is a genus of flowering plants from the orchid family, Orchidaceae. It contains only one known species, Lepidogyne longifolia, native to New Guinea and to Southeast Asia (Philippines, Malaysia, Borneo, Java, Sumatra).

See also 
 List of Orchidaceae genera

References 

Blume, C.L. von, (1859). Collection des Orchidées 93.
Pridgeon, A.M., Cribb, P.J., Chase, M.C. & Rasmussen, F.N. (2003). Genera Orchidacearum 3: 1–358. Oxford University Press.
Berg Pana, H. 2005. Handbuch der Orchideen-Namen. Dictionary of Orchid Names. Dizionario dei nomi delle orchidee. Ulmer, Stuttgart

External links 

Goodyerinae
Monotypic Orchidoideae genera
Cranichideae genera
Orchids of Asia
Orchids of New Guinea